Bratty may refer to:

Joe Bratty (c. 1961–1994), Northern Irish loyalist paramilitary and member of the Ulster Defence Association
Bratty v A-G for Northern Ireland, a 1963 British court case dealing with automatism

See also
Brat (disambiguation)